Nancy Conz (May 1, 1957 in Southampton, Massachusetts – February 8, 2017 in Southampton) was an American long distance runner and "pioneer" marathoner.

Early life 
Conz grew up in Southampton, Massachusetts. In 1975, Conz graduated from Hampshire Regional High School in Massachusetts.

Career 
Conz held four American long distance running records set in the early 1980s.  Three of those records, 15,000 meters, 10 miles and the one hour run were set in one track race at the University of Massachusetts in Amherst, Massachusetts on June 25, 1981; but these 3 all were broken by Molly Huddle in a 1 Nov 2020 event.

In 1980, Conz won her first attempt at the marathon in the Five College Marathon in South Hadley, Massachusetts. This was a qualifier for the marathon in London, England.
In August 1980, Conz ran her first international race and won second place at the Avon International Marathon for Women in London, England. Conz wore bib number 184. Conz finished in 2:36:02, and it was also the #2 time in the world that year. She returned the following year to win Avon, this time in Ottawa, beating her friend and future; winning the first ever women's Olympic gold medalist in the marathon, Joan Benoit.  She also won Freihofer's Run for Women that same year.  In 1982, she won the Chicago Marathon in a personal best of 2:33:22.

Conz was self-coached, her only previous coaching coming from her days at Hampshire Regional High School.

Personal life 
In 1979 Conz married Paul Conz, a former blues drummer. They have two children, Derek Conz and Jarryd Conz.

On February 8, 2017, Conz died in Southampton, Massachusetts after a near 20 year battle with adenoid cystic carcinoma. She was 59.

References

External links
 
 ARRS history

1957 births
2017 deaths
People from Southampton, Massachusetts
American female long-distance runners
American female marathon runners
Chicago Marathon female winners
Deaths from adenoid cystic carcinoma
Deaths from cancer in Massachusetts
21st-century American women